Garrity is a surname. Notable people with the surname include:

Chris Garrity (born 1981), professional lacrosse goaltender
Douglas Alan Garrity, American engineer
Freddie Garrity (1936–2006), singer and actor in the 1960s pop band Freddie and the Dreamers
George F. Garrity (1895–1967), United States Attorney for the District of Massachusetts
Gregg Garrity (born 1960), former professional American football wide receiver
Hank Garrity (disambiguation), several people
Jack Garrity (born 1926), retired ice hockey player
James A. Garrity (1878–1944), New York state senator
Jason Garrity (born 1993), English motorcycle speedway rider
John Garrity, officer in the United States Army
Ken Garrity (born 1935), retired English professional footballer
Pat Garrity (born 1976), retired American NBA basketball player
Robert T. Garrity, Jr. (born 1949), American lawyer and state legislator
Shaenon K. Garrity (born 1978), webcomics writer and artist, creator of Narbonic
Terry Garrity (born 1940), American author, also known as "J" (for "Joan"), author of The Sensuous Woman
Wendell Arthur Garrity Jr. (1920–1999), former U.S. District Judge in Massachusetts
Kevin Garrity III, Nobel Prize winner

See also
Garrity Creek, 3 mile creek in Richmond, California's Hilltop neighborhood
Friends of Garrity Creek (FGC) is a political organization promoting the preservation of Garrity Creek
Garrity warning, advisement of rights usually by U.S. federal agents to federal employees and contractors in internal investigations
"Mr. Garrity and the Graves", episode of the American television series The Twilight Zone
Garrity v. New Jersey, 385 U.S. 493 (1967), was a case concerning the right of public employees to be free from compulsory self-incrimination
McGarrity, surname page